Clyde Adolf Bruckman (June 30, 1894January 4, 1955) was an American writer and director of comedy films during the late silent era as well as the early sound era of cinema. Bruckman collaborated with such comedians as Buster Keaton, Monty Banks, W. C. Fields, Laurel and Hardy, The Three Stooges, Abbott and Costello, and Harold Lloyd.

Hollywood chronicler Kenneth Anger considers Bruckman to have been one of the key figures in the history of American screen comedy.

Early life
Clyde Adolf Bruckman was born on June 30, 1894 in San Bernardino, California. In 1911, Bruckman's father Rudolph was in a car accident that left him with headaches and brain damage. Rudolph shot himself in 1912.

Bruckman began writing for the sports pages of the San Bernardino Sun in the spring of 1912. In 1914, he moved to Los Angeles and got a job as a sportswriter for the Los Angeles Times. He later worked for the Los Angeles Examiner and the Saturday Evening Post.

On July 29, 1916, Bruckman married Lola Margaret Hamblin.

Career

Bruckman first worked in film in 1919, writing intertitles for Universal Pictures. In 1921, he moved to Warner Brothers and began writing gags for Buster Keaton.

Bruckman (pronounced "Brook-man") may be best known for his collaborations with Keaton, as Bruckman co-wrote several of Keaton's most popular films, including Our Hospitality, Sherlock Jr., The Navigator, Seven Chances, The Cameraman, and The General, which Bruckman also co-directed.

Bruckman directed four Laurel and Hardy comedies in the early stages of their established partnership at the Hal Roach Studios in 1927–1928, most notably The Battle of the Century with its celebrated custard pie fight. During this period he also wrote for and directed the thrill-comedians Harold Lloyd and Monty Banks.

Bruckman continued directing comedies during the sound era, his most famous credit being The Fatal Glass of Beer, W. C. Fields' esoteric satire of Yukon melodramas. Unfortunately for his career path, Bruckman's fondness for alcohol caused production delays that cost him directorial assignments. From 1935 forward, Bruckman would be limited to writing scripts.

Recycling gags 
Bruckman's wealth of silent-comedy experience earned him a steady position in Columbia Pictures' short-subject department (Bruckman was instrumental in Columbia's hiring his old boss Keaton in 1939). Bruckman continued to write new material for The Three Stooges and other comics, but as time went by, he resorted to borrowing gags from Lloyd's and Keaton's silent films. After Bruckman lifted the magician's-coat sequence from Lloyd's Movie Crazy for The Three Stooges' Loco Boy Makes Good, and the "loosely basted tuxedo" routine from Lloyd's The Freshman for the Stooges' Three Smart Saps, Lloyd sued Columbia and won. "Never mind that Bruckman had co-written and co-directed Movie Crazy, giving him a pretty strong claim to intellectual ownership of the routine, or that Bruckman and Lloyd may very well have borrowed their ideas from a vaudeville act in the first place", wrote Ethan Gates in The New Republic, reviewing Matthew Dessem's 2015 biography of Bruckman, The Gag Man.

One example of Bruckman's constant recycling is a routine involving the comedian thinking he is boxed-in while trying to leave a parallel parking space. The routine was used at least four times by Bruckman: with Lloyd Hamilton in Too Many Highballs (1933); W. C. Fields in Man on the Flying Trapeze (1935); Buster Keaton in Nothing But Pleasure (1940); and an episode of The Abbott and Costello Show called Car Trouble (1954).

Bruckman was hired by Universal Pictures to write comedy scenes for the studio's "B" musical features. This was a lucrative assignment that paid better than short subjects. He continued recycling gags but on a larger scale, now lifting entire sequences from older films. He inserted the tuxedo routine into Universal's "B" musical-comedy feature Her Lucky Night. Bruckman adapted material from Lloyd's Welcome Danger into Universal's Joan Davis–Leon Errol comedy She Gets Her Man, and again consulted Movie Crazy for Universal's "B" comedy So's Your Uncle. Lloyd, outraged by three "wholesale infringements" within months, filed suit for US$1,700,000; the court ruled for Lloyd but granted damages of $40,000. Bruckman was fired, and never worked on a feature film again. Demoralized, he returned to Columbia, where his work was now so slipshod that he would simply hand in an old script, without any attempt at updating or revising it.

The 1950s 
The advent of television, and its constant need for broadcast material, gave Bruckman a new start. Abbott and Costello launched a filmed television series in 1951. Having used up most of their own familiar routines during the show's first season, the comedians hired Clyde Bruckman, and his mental storehouse of gags saw them through a second season. Although Bruckman received credit for several scripts, these turned out to contain reworkings of old Keaton and Lloyd gags. Again, Lloyd filed suit, naming Abbott & Costello's production company as a party to the suit. As a result, other producers were unwilling to hire Bruckman.

Bruckman's only safe haven was Columbia, but producer Jules White had already filled his quota of scripts for that season, and had no immediate need for Bruckman's services.

Suicide
With nowhere else to turn, the desolate Bruckman borrowed a .45-caliber pistol from Keaton, claiming to need it for a hunting trip. On the afternoon of January 4, 1955, Bruckman, a resident of Santa Monica, California, parked his car outside a local restaurant, entered a restroom, and shot himself in the head. He left a typed note requesting that his wife be notified and his body be donated for medical or experimental purposes, stating that "I have no money to pay for a funeral."

Some reports claim the location was Santa Monica Boulevard in Hollywood or inside a phone booth, but according to his January 5 obituary, it was in the city of Santa Monica, and Bruckman left a typewritten note for the "gentlemen of the Santa Monica Police Department." Neither Keaton nor White had any inkling of Bruckman's intentions.

Personal life
Bruckman married first wife Lola in 1916. She died after complications from emergency surgery on October 8, 1931. He was married to his second wife, Gladys, from March 1932 until his death. They had no children.

Cultural references 
The X-Files Season 3 episode "Clyde Bruckman's Final Repose" features a character, played by Peter Boyle, who foresees how other people die. Two detective characters on that episode are named Havez and Cline, after Jean Havez and Eddie Cline, two other writers who also worked with Keaton. As with his real-life namesake, Boyle's Bruckman character kills himself.

References

External links 

 Clyde Bruckman at Allmovie

1894 births
1955 suicides
Suicides by firearm in California
American male screenwriters
Writers from San Jose, California
Film directors from California
Screenwriters from California
20th-century American male writers
20th-century American screenwriters